Shmuel Ben Dror (1924 – January 6, 2009) was an Israeli association football player.

Football career

Ben Dror was born in Petah Tikva. He played defense for the Israeli national football team. He served as their first captain and scored the team's first goal, in 1948. He also played for Maccabi Petah Tikva.

In addition, he served on the board of directors of the Israel Football Association.

References

1924 births
2009 deaths
Israeli footballers
Israel international footballers
Association football defenders
Maccabi Petah Tikva F.C. players
Footballers from Petah Tikva